The Acre Family Barn, in Blaine County, Oklahoma near Canton, Oklahoma, was listed on the National Register of Historic Places in 2013.

It is a  "one-and-one-half story, medium-sized Transverse crib barn" built around 1916.

It is one of 11 historic barns in Oklahoma listed on the National Register.

References

Barns in Oklahoma
National Register of Historic Places in Blaine County, Oklahoma
Buildings and structures completed in 1916